Lord Hardinge may refer to:
Henry Hardinge, 1st Viscount Hardinge (1755–1856), British field marshal
Charles Hardinge, 1st Baron Hardinge of Penshurst (1858–1944), British diplomat and the grandson of the first viscount.